Aase is a Norwegian surname. Notable people with the surname include:

Daniel Aase (born 1989), Norwegian footballer
Dennis Aase (born 1944), American racing driver
Don Aase (born 1954), American baseball player
Gunnar Aase (born 1971), Norwegian footballer
Hannah Caroline Aase (1883–1980), botanist and cytologist
Ingvald B. Aase (1882–1948), Norwegian politician
Olav Aase (1914–1992), Norwegian politician
Peter Aase (born 1995), Norwegian footballer
Steinar Aase (born 1955), Norwegian footballer
Hannah Caroline Aase (1883–1980), American botanist 
Torstein Andersen Aase (born 1991), Norwegian footballer

See also
Aase syndrome, rare inherited disorder characterized by anemia with some joint and skeletal deformities
African American Standard English, a concept tied to African American Vernacular English, and American English.
Peer Gynt; the mother of the title character is Ase (sometimes spelled "Aase").
864 Aase, an asteroid
Åse (disambiguation)

Norwegian-language surnames